The 2002 Rally Australia (formally the 15th Telstra Rally Australia) was the thirteenth round of the 2002 World Rally Championship. The race was held over four days between 31 October and 3 November 2002, and was won by Peugeot's Marcus Grönholm, his 12th win in the World Rally Championship.

Background

Entry list

Itinerary
All dates and times are AWST (UTC+8).

Results

Overall

World Rally Cars

Classification

Special stages

Championship standings
Bold text indicates 2002 World Champions.

Production World Rally Championship

Classification

Special stages

Championship standings
Bold text indicates 2002 World Champions.

References

External links 
 Official website of the World Rally Championship

Australia
Rally Australia
Rally